Sławomir Szwedowski (1928–2000) was a
Polish economist, professor at the
Institute of Economic Sciences of the Polish Academy of Sciences.

Until 1990, he was the financial director of the Institute (the head director was
Professor Jozef Pajestka and Professor Cezary Jozefiak). From 1994 to
1997, he was the science director (the head director at the time was
Professor (former Prime Minister) Marek Belka). In addition, he was a member of the Science Council of the Institute.

Selected scientific papers:
       Methods of measuring the efficiency of scientific and technical progress, 1976
      The politics and economics of scientific and technical progress, 1986
      Problems in technical progress, 1976
       The rationality and effectiveness of mechanisms of steering scientific and technical progress, 1991
He was published in the publications Gospodarka Polski [The Polish
Economy] and Studia Ekonomiczne [Economic Studies], among others.

See also

 List of Poles
 Szwedowski of Korwin coat of arms

1928 births
2000 deaths
20th-century  Polish economists